George Clifford (10 February 1896 – after 1930) was an English footballer who played in the Football League for Mansfield Town and Portsmouth. He was born in Harrogate.

References

1896 births
Year of death missing
Sportspeople from Harrogate
Association football fullbacks
English footballers
Sutton Junction F.C. players
Mansfield Town F.C. players
Portsmouth F.C. players
Ilkeston United F.C. players
English Football League players